Megapedion is a genus of beetles in the family Cerambycidae, containing the following species:

 Megapedion lefebvrei (Gounelle, 1909)
 Megapedion sylphis (Bates, 1870)

References

Ibidionini